Makame is a Tanzanian given name. Notable people with the name include:

 Makame Mbarawa (born 1961), Tanzanian politician 
 Makame Rashidi (died 2013), Tanzanian military officer and diplomat

African given names